Izvorul Muntelui may refer to the following places in Romania:

 Izvorul Muntelui, a village in the commune Bicaz, Neamț County
 Lake Izvorul Muntelui, a large artificial lake in Neamț County
 Izvorul Muntelui (river), a tributary of the Bistrița in Neamț County